Eduardo Flaquer Vázquez (4 November 1896 – 18 August 1951) was a Spanish tennis player who represented Spain in the Davis Cup and Olympic Games. He competed in the singles event at the 1924 Summer Olympics, reaching the second round in which he lost to Jean Washer. With compatriot Ricardo Saprissa he competed in the men's doubles event and reached the third round. In the mixed doubles he teamed up with compatriot Lilí Álvarez and reached the quarterfinal.

He competed in the 1922 Wimbledon Championships and reached the fourth round of the singles event in which he lost to Pat O'Hara Wood. In the 1923 Wimbledon Championships he reached the final of the doubles event with Manuel de Gomar.

Grand Slam finals

Doubles (1 runner-up)

References

External links
 
 

1890s births
1951 deaths
Spanish male tennis players
Olympic tennis players of Spain
Tennis players at the 1924 Summer Olympics
Tennis players from Barcelona